Dardan Mustafa (born 5 February 1992) is a German footballer who plays for Österlen FF as a forward.

References

External links

1992 births
Living people
Swedish footballers
Swedish expatriate footballers
Association football forwards
IFK Värnamo players
Lunds BK players
Gefle IF players
Örgryte IS players
Assyriska BK players
Åtvidabergs FF players
Torns IF players
Allsvenskan players
Superettan players
Ettan Fotboll players
Serie D players
Swedish expatriate sportspeople in Italy
Expatriate footballers in Italy